This is a list of notable vocal coaches. A vocal coach, also known as voice coach, is a music teacher who instructs singers on how to improve their singing technique, take care of and develop their voice, and prepare for the performance of a song or other work. Vocal coaches may give private music lessons to singers, or they may coach singers who are rehearsing on stage, or who are singing during a recording session.

A

B
 Jason Barry-Smith
 Yvie Burnett
 Rosemary Butler

C
 Romana Carén
 Gary Catona
 Erana Clark

D
 Nazzareno De Angelis
 Jean Del Val
 Frances Dickinson

E
 Jo Estill

F
 Andrea Figallo
 Kate Firth

G
 Delta Goodrem
 Artemis Gounaki
 Carrie Grant
 David Grant
Renee Grant-Williams

H

 Jean Holden

J
 Floor Jansen

K
 K.Will
 Rasa Kaušiūtė
 Darlene Koldenhoven
 Sonja Kristina

L
 Lilli Lehmann
 Estelle Liebling
 Ray Lyell

M

 Mathilde Marchesi
 John Moriarty (conductor)

O
 Sylvia Olden Lee

P

 Alexandros Panayi
 Miguel Franz Pinto

Q

R
 Luigi Ricci (vocal coach)
 Martin Rich
 Seth Riggs
 Gil Robbins
 Frances Robinson-Duff
 Betty Roe
 Berle Sanford Rosenberg

S

 CeCe Sammy
 Pyotr Slovtsov
 Victor Sokovnin
 Amanda Somerville
 Vibeke Stene

T
 Ken Tamplin

U
 Paul Ulanowsky

V
 Jaime Vendera

W

 Cornelis Witthoefft
 Lana Wolf

Z
 Mr. Zel

See also
 Music education

References

Singing